GT Advance 2: Rally Racing, known in Japan as , is a rally racing game developed by MTO and published by THQ for the Game Boy Advance. It is the sequel to GT Advance Championship Racing.

Gameplay

GT Advance 2: Rally Racing is a racing game and the cars and environments hold true to a rally racing format. The game contains fifteen cars from Japanese companies such as Subaru, Suzuki, and Mitsubishi. Upgrades are not available for the cars, but it is possible to fine-tune them to fit personal preference.

Game modes
The game has several different modes. The main part of the game, "world rally", moves the player through fourteen courses found in various locations in the world. The game also has a head-to-head mode against a friend with a system link, 15 different license tests that familiarize the player with the controls of the game, a time trial mode, a single race mode, a practice mode, and a navigator mode, in which the player directs the driver of the car through button and d-pad presses instead of driving themselves.

Save system
The game includes a major enhancement in the save system from the previous installment. In GT Advance Championship Racing, as a cost-saving measure, the battery RAM was pulled from the game and was replaced with a password system instead of the one included in the Japanese version of the game. Critics cited this as the chief problem with the North American release of the game. GT Advance 2: Rally Racing addressed the problem by putting the normal save system back in, yet making this game a little less favorable than its predecessor.

Reception

GT Advance 2: Rally Racing received "generally favorable reviews", albeit a little less favorable than the first game, according to the review aggregation website Metacritic. IGN complimented THQ for addressing the previous game's mistakes. GameSpy praised GT Advance 2, pointing out the refreshing realism aspect of the weather conditions that pop up from time to time in the game and require the player to tune their car before a race. In Japan, Famitsu gave it a score of 28 out of 40.

GT Advance 2: Rally Racing was a runner-up for GameSpots annual "Best Driving Game on Game Boy Advance" award, which went to Driver 2 Advance.

References

External links
 

2001 video games
Game Boy Advance games
Game Boy Advance-only games
MTO (video game company) games
Multiplayer and single-player video games
Racing video games
THQ games
Video games developed in Japan